Peter Broadbent may refer to:
Pete Broadbent (born 1952), Bishop of Willesden in the Church of England
Peter Broadbent (footballer) (1933–2013), English international footballer